Richard Leonard is an Irish international lawn bowler and former British champion.

Bowls career
Leonard won the Irish National Bowls Championships singles in 2010 bowling for St James Gate BC  and subsequently won the singles at the British Isles Bowls Championships in 2011.

He was also the Irish pairs champion in 2004, singles runner up in 2019, and triples winner in 2009 and 2010 and fours champion in 2013.

References

Living people
Male lawn bowls players from Northern Ireland
Year of birth missing (living people)